The Iran men's national under-19 basketball team is the national under-19 men's basketball team of Iran. The team's home venue is Azadi Basketball Hall.

Tournament records

FIBA Asia Under-18 Championship record

FIBA Under-19 World Championship record

Roster
Iran roster at FIBA Asia Under-18 Championship 2008:

Head coaches

References

External links
 Iran Basketball Federation

under-19
Men's national under-19 basketball teams